Philip von Stefenelli (born April 10, 1969) is a Canadian former professional ice hockey defenceman. 

von Stefenelli was drafted 122nd overall by the Vancouver Canucks in the 1988 NHL Entry Draft. He played two seasons in the National Hockey League, 27 games for the Boston Bruins in the 1995-96 season and 6 games for the Ottawa Senators in the 1996-97 NHL season.

From 1998 to 2006, von Stefenelli played in the Deutsche Eishockey Liga in Germany, playing for the Frankfurt Lions, Krefeld Pinguine, Hamburg Freezers and ERC Ingolstadt.

Career statistics

References

External links
 

1969 births
Living people
Boston Bruins players
Boston University Terriers men's ice hockey players
Canadian ice hockey defencemen
ECH Chur players
Detroit Vipers players
Frankfurt Lions players
Hamburg Freezers players
Hamilton Canucks players
ERC Ingolstadt players
Krefeld Pinguine players
Langley Eagles players
Milwaukee Admirals (IHL) players
Ottawa Senators players
Providence Bruins players
Richmond Sockeyes players
Ice hockey people from Vancouver
Vancouver Canucks draft picks